Streptomyces arboris is a bacterium species from the genus Streptomyces which has been isolated from soil of Populus euphratica wetland.

See also 
 List of Streptomyces species

References 

arboris
Bacteria described in 2020